Pama International is an eight-piece reggae band from the United Kingdom. They describe themselves as 'Dub Fuelled Ska Rocksteady & Reggae'. They often play with other ska, dub and reggae artists. The band takes elements from many sources to produce their sound whilst broadly staying within the reggae format.

In 2006, the band became the first new band in thirty years to sign to Trojan Records. Their earlier albums were released by Jamdown Records. The resulting release, Trojan Sessions, had a line-up of vintage ska and reggae guests including Rico Rodriguez, Dennis Alcapone, Dawn Penn, Derrick Morgan and the first recording since the 1970s from Dave and Ansel Collins.

In 2008, the band released Love Filled Dub Band on the Rockers Revolt record label, featuring vocals from Michie One on the track "Highrise".

Finny and Flowerdew were previously members of the British ska band, The Loafers.  Golding is an original and current member of The Specials.

Discography

Studio albums
 Pama International (Jamdown) 2002
 Too Many Freaks Not Enough Stages (Jamdown) 2004
 Float Like A Butterfly (Jamdown/Do The Dog-UK, Asian Man Rcds-USA) 2004
 Trojan Sessions (Trojan) 2006
 Love Filled Dub Band (Rockers Revolt) 2008
 Highrise Campaign (Rockers Revolt) 2009
 Pama Outernational (Rockers Revolt) 2009
Love & Austerity (Happy People) 2017

EPs
 Dub Store Special (Jamdown) 2005

References

[ AllMusic]

External links
Pama International Official website
Pama International Official Myspace Page
Discography on official website

British reggae musical groups
Trojan Records artists